One97 Communications (OCL) is the parent entity of leading Indian mobile payments and financial services company Paytm , headquartered in Noida, India. It was founded in 2000 by Vijay Shekhar Sharma. In July 2021, the company filed the offer document for the largest ever initial public offering (IPO)  in India’s history. It was listed on Indian stock exchanges  on November 8, 2021.

Through its network of subsidiaries and businesses, the company offers a range of digital payment and financial services to consumers and merchants in India. It also provides mobile advertising, marketing and payments for merchants.

History 
One97 Communications Limited was founded in 2000 by Vijay Shekhar Sharma in New Delhi. The company is headquartered in Noida, India. It launched Paytm in 2009 as a digital payments platform to facilitate cashless payments. It owns various businesses and subsidiaries – Paytm Payments Bank, Paytm Payments Gateway, Paytm Payout, Paytm Money, Paytm Insider, Paytm Insurance, Paytm Postpaid, Paytm for Business, Paytm Credit Cards, and Paytm First Games.

Funding 
In October 2011, One97 Communications received funding of $10 million from SAP Ventures. In January 2015, Ant Financial Services Group picked 25% stake in the company. In March 2015, Ratan Tata made a personal investment in One97 Communications's Paytm and joined as an adviser of the company. It received funding of $60 million from MediaTek's investment funds Mountain Capital, which made the company's valuation at $4.8 billion in August 2016.

In May 2017, the company raised $1.4 billion from Japan's SoftBank Group, which made its valuation jumped to over $8 billion. Paytm raised $300 million from Warren Buffett’s Berkshire Hathaway in September 2018. In November 2019, the company secured $1 billion in a Series G funding led by T Rowe Price and existing investors Ant Financial and SoftBank Vision Fund. Discovery Capital also participated in the round. Paytm raised Rs 9,000 crore ($1.4 billion) from SoftBank.

Acquisition 
In December 2012, the company acquired MobiVite, a mobile marketing platform followed by the acquisition of Plustx, a cross-messaging platform in August 2013.

IPO 
One97 Communications was scheduled to launch its IPO In November 2010. However, it shelved the listing plans last moment, citing volatile market conditions. On 16 July 2021, the company filed draft prospectus for its IPO of up to ₹16,600 crore and various news outlets reported it to be India's largest Initial public offering ever. It is listed on National Stock Exchange of India and Bombay Stock Exchange since November 2021.

The company's initial share sale aimed to raise ₹18,300 crore at a band of ₹2,080-2,150, valuing it at ₹1.39 trillion. The company's IPO was subscribed 18% on the first day, having received bids for 8.742 million shares against the total issue size of 48.4 million shares.
 Its IPO was subscribed 48% on the second day and it was fully subscribed on the final day of the issue. However, its shares fell 13% and 27% respectively on the days succeeding its listing and has continued to slide sparking criticism on its valuation methodologies, inviting regulatory scrutiny.
The company has destroyed a whopping 1 lac crore of the investor's money, and every uplift results in the selling/exit of big investors and retail investor being stuck.

Financials 
According to RedSeer, it has the largest payments platform in India with a gross merchant value of Rs 4,033 billion in the financial year 2021. According to its annual 2021 report, One97's revenue from operations dropped 14% to Rs 2,802 crore for FY 2021. However, losses narrowed to Rs 1,701 crore during this year, compared to Rs 2,942 crore loss reported in the fiscal year 2020.

One97 Communications reduced losses by 28% to Rs 2,833 crore in the FY 2019-20. Its overall expenses were reduced by 20% in 2019-20 to Rs 5,861 crore compared to Rs 7,254 crore in 2019-18. Its revenue also declined 1% to Rs 3,350 crore in FY20.

Awards and recognition 
In August 2009, One97 Communications was awarded the Emerging Company of The Year at the 10th Annual Voice&Data Award 2009 for its contribution to the VAS space.  In the same year, it was also awarded the Deloitte Technology Fast50 India award in 2009.
In December 2010, One97 Communications won the Best Digital Innovation category for its 'TalktoMe' product at IAMAI's Digital Awards by the Internet and Mobile Association of India. It won Company of the Year at ET Now-IndiaMART Leaders of Tomorrow Awards 2010. In May 2011, One97's product Talk2Me was awarded the Best Innovative VAS Product at the ET Telecom Awards by The Economic Times. One97 Communications was ranked #493 in the Deloitte Technology Fast 500 Asia Pacific list in 2012. The company was awarded the VCCircle Annual Awards 2013 for the best PE/VC-backed Media & Communication Company.

In March 2014, One97 was announced as the Most Innovative Company of the Year 2014 at the Business Standard's Awards. In July 2015, it won NDTV's Disruptive Digital Innovator Award. The company was ranked #309 in the list of Fortune Next 500 company for the year 2017.

See also 
 List of unicorn startup companies

References

External links 
  

Indian companies established in 2000
Companies based in Noida
Financial services companies of India
2009 establishments in Uttar Pradesh
Softbank portfolio companies
Companies listed on the National Stock Exchange of India
Companies listed on the Bombay Stock Exchange